William G. Bassler (born March 6, 1938) is a former United States district judge of the United States District Court for the District of New Jersey, serving from 1991 until 2006. He is currently an adjunct professor at Fordham Law School in New York City and works as an arbitrator and mediator in New Jersey and New York City.

Early life and career
Bassler was born in Butler, Pennsylvania. He attended Fordham University (Bachelor of Arts 1960), Georgetown University Law Center (Juris Doctor 1963), New York University School of Law (Master of Laws 1969), and University of Virginia Law School (Judicial Process Master of Laws 1995). After finishing law school, Bassler clerked for Judge Mark Sullivan of the Appellate Division of the New Jersey Superior Court.

Since 1964 and until his first judicial appointment in 1988 he was an attorney in private practice at a succession of small New Jersey firms. He was initially an associate and then a partner in the law firm of Parsons, Canzona, Blair & Warren. He then became a name partner in Labrecque, Parsons & Bassler. In 1983, he joined Evans, Koelzer, Osborne, Kreizman & Bassler, and from 1984 until his ascension to the bench he was a partner in Carton, Nary, Witt & Arvanitis. Bassler's practice was primarily civil and confined to New Jersey state courts.

Judicial service
Bassler was appointed to the New Jersey Superior Court in 1988 by then-governor Thomas Kean (Republican). Shortly thereafter he was nominated to be a United States District Judge of the United States District Court for the District of New Jersey by then-president George H. W. Bush on June 14, 1991. He received a "qualified" recommendation from the American Bar Association. Bassler was confirmed by the Senate on September 12, 1991, and took his commission on September 16, 1991, replacing Judge Stanley Brotman. Bassler assumed senior status on March 6, 2005, and retired shortly after on August 31, 2006.

Besides penning several hundred judicial opinions from the bench, Bassler also authored published articles on legal topics, including some as a federal judge in the 1990s.

References

Sources
 
 Judge Bassler's Website
 Speech by Sen. Lautenberg (D-NJ) in support of the nomination in the U.S. Senate, September 12, 1991.

1938 births
Living people
American legal scholars
Fordham University alumni
Georgetown University Law Center alumni
Judges of the United States District Court for the District of New Jersey
New Jersey state court judges
New York University School of Law alumni
People from Butler, Pennsylvania
Rutgers School of Law–Newark faculty
Seton Hall University School of Law faculty
Superior court judges in the United States
United States district court judges appointed by George H. W. Bush
20th-century American judges
University of Virginia School of Law alumni